The Showdown is a 1940 American Western film directed by Howard Bretherton, written by Donald Kusel and Harold Daniel Kusel, and starring William Boyd, Russell Hayden, Britt Wood, Morris Ankrum, Jan Clayton, Wright Kramer and Donald Kirke. It was released on March 8, 1940, by Paramount Pictures.

Plot
A Baron from Europe is out to steal some race horses, rename them and then race them from the Colonel's ranch. Hoppy becomes suspicious of the Baron, so when he wins money from him at poker, he marks the bills. Then gets robbed, but when the money appears it is in the Baron's hands.

Cast 
 William Boyd as Hopalong Cassidy
 Russell Hayden as Lucky Jenkins
 Britt Wood as Speedy McGinnis
 Morris Ankrum as Baron Rendor
 Jan Clayton as Sue Willard 
 Wright Kramer as Colonel Rufe White
 Donald Kirke as Harry Cole
 Roy Barcroft as Bowman
 Eddie Dean as The Marshal
 Kermit Maynard as Henchman Johnson
 Walter Shumway as Henchman Snell
 The King's Men as Singing Cowhands

References

External links 
 
 
 
 

1940 films
American black-and-white films
Films directed by Howard Bretherton
Paramount Pictures films
American Western (genre) films
1940 Western (genre) films
Hopalong Cassidy films
1940s English-language films
1940s American films